Evett Dumas Nix, often known as E.D. Nix, (September 19, 1861 - February 6, 1946) was a United States Marshal in the late 19th century handling the jurisdiction that included the wild Oklahoma Territory, later to be the state of Oklahoma. He was first appointed in 1893, in the closing years of the Old West, during the last years of the "Hanging Judge" Parker tenure.

Biography
Born in Kentucky, his uncle was a county sheriff, and his father a deputy sheriff. He went into business, working in sales and operating a grocery store and a hardware store. In 1885 he married childhood girlfriend Ellen Felts. Nix first came to Oklahoma during the Land Run of 1891, and was a Guthrie, Oklahoma, businessman with many influential friends, to include rancher Oscar Halsell, who for a time employed Bill Doolin and other members of the Doolin Dalton Gang, and who was involved in the 1884 Hunnewell Gunfight. When he was appointed to the position of US Marshal he was only 32 years of age, the youngest holding that position at the time.

Law enforcement career
He took over in a very volatile time. The Doolin Dalton gang was in full swing, committing bank robberies and train robberies in Oklahoma, Texas, and Arkansas. The outlaws had a haven in Ingalls, Oklahoma, and Marshal Nix wasted no time in moving to bring the gang down. His first course of action was to organize a posse to take the outlaws in Ingalls. With Deputy Marshal John Hixon in the lead, Nix dispatched a posse of fourteen Deputy Marshals to Ingalls. On September 1, 1893, in what would become known as the Battle of Ingalls, three of his deputy marshals, Deputy Marshal Thomas Hueston, Deputy Marshal Richard Speed, and Deputy Marshal Lafayette Shadley were killed in the ensuing gunbattle. Outlaws "Bittercreek" Newcomb, Charley Pierce, and "Dynamite Dan" Clifton were wounded, but escaped. Outlaw "Arkansas Tom" Jones was stunned and captured after dynamite was thrown at him by Deputy Marshal Jim Masterson. And a saloon owner known only as Murray was badly wounded by the marshals when he began shooting at the lawmen in defense of the outlaws.

To topple the gang, Nix organized a special elite group of one hundred marshals, including Heck Thomas, Bill Tilghman, and Chris Madsen, who became known as the Three Guardsmen. Marshal Nix was staunchly defensive of his deputies, and the actions they were forced to take in order to bring the gang to justice. With Nix in support of them, the marshals began to whittle away at the gang, and by 1898 the entire Doolin Dalton gang had been wiped out with the exception of "Arkansas Tom" Jones, who was in prison. After his release he returned to breaking the law and was killed by lawmen.

Two years after the Battle of Ingalls, saloon owner Murray was seeking damages for having been shot by the marshals. Marshal Nix stood in defense of his deputies, and addressed the Attorney General Judson Harmon directly on the matter, stating in part; "Murray and other citizens catered to their trade, carried them news of the movements of deputy marshals, furnished them with ammunition, cared for their horses, permitted them to eat at their tables and sleep in their beds", and continued "This man Murray came to the front door of the saloon either just before the outlaws left the building or just after, it is not known which. However, when he first appeared in the doorway, he had the door open just a short distance and had his winchester to his shoulder in the act of firing", he then added that "Three of the deputies seeing him in the position he was in, fired on him simultaneously. Two of the shots struck him and one broke his arm in two places." The letter is now housed in the National Archives.

Later life and death
Nix was dismissed from his position after an audit in 1896, after critics accused him of misusing funds. Many now believe that he was merely the victim of the fee system used at the time for payment of Deputy Marshals, and he actually did not mismanage any funds. He returned to life as a businessman in Guthrie following his dismissal, in which he saw success. In 1929 Nix co-authored a book titled Oklahombres with Gordon Hines, detailing much of the work that went into bringing the gang down, in addition to the hunting down of many other outlaws, including the Jennings Gang. He also documents his youth in Kentucky, and reflects on the changes that had taken place from the 1890s to the 1920s in the way of the outlaws and the lawmen.

See also

 List of Old West lawmen

References

External links
The Doolin Dalton Gang and E.D. Nix
"The Oklahombres, Particularly the Wilder Ones, by Gordon Hines and E.D. Nix
Doolin Gang wins battle but loses war
U.S. Marshal E.D. Nix 
 

1861 births
1946 deaths
United States Marshals
People from Kentucky
Lawmen of the American Old West